Nottingham Community Access and Job Training School is an alternate public high school located in the St. Louis Hills neighborhood of St. Louis, Missouri. Nottingham is a public alternative high school designed to help students with moderate to severe disabilities find employment through work placement programs

Clubs
Basketball
Volleyball
Track
Challenger Baseball
Student Council
Fine Arts Club
Choir
Games Club
Exercise & Fitness Club

References

High schools in St. Louis
Public high schools in Missouri
Educational institutions established in 1996
1996 establishments in Missouri
Buildings and structures in St. Louis